The Law Reform (Husband and Wife) Act 1962 (c.48) is an Act of the Parliament of the United Kingdom that allows husbands and wives to sue each other under tort law. Originally covering both England and Wales and Scotland, the Scottish provisions were repealed by the Family Law (Scotland) Act 2006.

Act
Under the common law and Section 12 of the Married Women's Property Act 1882, a husband and wife were incapable of committing tortious acts against each other, and could not sue each other under tort law. The Law Reform Committee, in its Ninth Report, recommended the abolition of this set of circumstances, and their recommendation was made into the Law Reform (Husband and Wife) Bill, which was given royal assent on 1 August 1962.

The Act provides that married couples can sue each other under tort, with two exceptions; first, where the court believes there would be no great benefit from a legal action (in which case it can stay the proceedings) and second, when the dispute is to do with property.

References

Bibliography

United Kingdom Acts of Parliament 1962
Law reform in the United Kingdom
United Kingdom tort law